Massimo Faggioli (born 1970) is an Italian academic, Church historian, professor of theology and religious studies at Villanova University, columnist for La Croix International, and contributing writer to Commonweal. 

He was on the faculty at the University of St. Thomas (St. Paul, Minnesota) from 2009 to 2016, where he was the founding director of the Institute for Catholicism and Citizenship. Since 2017, he has been an adjunct professor at the Broken Bay Institute, which is part of the Australian Institute of Theological Education in Sydney, Australia.

Early work
He worked in the John XXIII Foundation for Religious Studies in Bologna between 1996 and 2008 and received his Ph.D. from the University of Turin in 2002.

Career
He is full professor in the Department of Theology and Religious Studies at Villanova University (Philadelphia). He was the founding director (2014-2015) of the Institute for Catholicism and Citizenship and on the faculty in the Department of Theology at the University of St. Thomas in St. Paul (Minnesota) between 2009 and 2016. He writes regularly for newspapers and journals on the Church, religion and politics, frequently gives public lectures on the Church and on Vatican II. Faggioli was the co-chair of the study group “Vatican II Studies” for the “American Academy of Religion” (2012–2016). 

His "Annual Cardinal Joseph Bernardin Lecture" held at the University of South Carolina on October 7, 2013 and published in America on February 24, 2014 issue, focusing on the relationship between Catholics and politics.

Since November 2014 he is columnist for La Croix International (formerly Global Pulse Magazine).

Select publications 
 Il vescovo e il concilio. Modello episcopale e aggiornamento al Vaticano II, Il Mulino, Bologna 2005, 476 pp.
 Breve storia dei movimenti cattolici, Carocci, Roma 2008, 146 pp. (Spanish translation: Historia y evolución de los movimientos católicos. De León XIII a Benedicto XVI, Madrid: PPC Editorial, 2011, pp. 224)
 Vatican II: The Battle for Meaning, New York/Mahwah, NJ, Paulist Press 2012, pp. 207 (Italian translation: Interpretare il Vaticano II. Storia di un dibattito, Bologna, EDB, 2013, 160 pp.; Portuguese translation: Vaticano II. A luta pelo sentido, translated by Jaime A. Clasen, São Paulo, Editora Paulinas Brasil, 2013, 216 pp.)
 True Reform. Liturgy and Ecclesiology in Sacrosanctum Concilium, Collegeville MN, Liturgical Press 2012, pp. 188 (Italian translation: Vera riforma. Liturgia ed ecclesiologia nel Vaticano II, Bologna, EDB, 2013, 192 pp.; German translation: Sacrosanctum Concilium. Der Schlüssel zum Zweiten Vatikanischen Konzil, Freiburg i.B., Herder, 2015).
 Nello spirito del concilio. Movimenti ecclesiali e recezione del Vaticano II, Cinisello B.: San Paolo, 2013, 160 pp.
 Papa Francesco e la “chiesa-mondo”, Roma, Armando Editore, 2014, 96 pp.
 Pope John XXIII. The Medicine of Mercy, Collegeville MN, Liturgical Press, 2014, 160 pp.
 Sorting Out Catholicism. Brief History of the New Ecclesial Movements, Collegeville MN, Liturgical Press, 2014, 224 pp.
 Pope Francis. Tradition in Transition, New York, Paulist Press, 2015, 104 pp.
 A Council for the Global Church. Receiving Vatican II in History, Minneapolis, Fortress Press, 2015, 350 pp.
 The Legacy of Vatican II, eds. Massimo Faggioli and Andrea Vicini SJ, New York, Paulist Press, 2015, 320 pp.
 The Rising Laity. Ecclesial Movements since Vatican II, New York, Paulist Press, 2016, 176 pp.
 Catholicism and Citizenship. Political Cultures of the Church in the 21st Century, Collegeville MN, Liturgical Press, 2017, 165 pp.
 Cattolicesimo, nazionalismo, cosmopolitismo. Chiesa, società e politica dal Vaticano II a papa Francesco, Roma, Armando Editore, 2018, 176 pp.
 The Liminal Papacy of Pope Francis. Moving Toward Global Catholicity, Maryknoll NY: Orbis Books, 2020, 210 pp.
 Joe Biden e il cattolicesimo negli Stati Uniti, Brescia: Morcelliana, 2021, 208 pp.
 Joe Biden and Catholicism in the United States, Bayard 2021.

Awards
 2021 Catholic Media Association award for the book The Liminal Papacy of Pope Francis (Orbis Books, 2020), first place in the “Pope Francis” category.
"Yves Congar Award for Theological Excellence" from Barry University in Miami, Florida on January 24, 2019.
Catholic Press Association Award 2018 for the book "Catholicism and Citizenship: Political Cultures of the Church in the Twenty-First Century" (Collegeville MN, Liturgical Press 2017), third place in the category “Faithful citizenship / religious freedom”.
 Honorary doctorate in Sacred Theology from Sacred Heart University (Connecticut) (February 7, 2018).
"Jerome Award" (year 2017) of the Catholic Library Association awarded in recognition of outstanding contribution and commitment to excellence in scholarship.
Excellence in Publishing Book Awards (year 2015) of Association of Catholic Publishers for the book Sorting Out Catholicism: Brief History of the New Ecclesial Movements (Collegeville MN: Liturgical Press, 2014), first place ex aequo in the category “General interest”.
The books True Reform: Liturgy and Ecclesiology in Sacrosanctum Concilium (Liturgical Press, 2012) and Vatican II: The Battle for Meaning (Paulist Press, 2012) were among the five finalists in the theology category in the “Excellence in Publishing Awards” sponsored by the Association of Catholic Publishers (year 2013). True Reform took third place in the Theology category in the ACP 2013 Book Awards.
The article “Vatican II at 50: Promises Made Promises Delivered”, published in the October 2012 issue of Liguorian Magazine, won second place for “Best Coverage of the 50th Anniversary of Vatican II’s Opening” at the 2013 Catholic Press Awards.

References

External links
 https://villanova.academia.edu/MassimoFaggioli
 http://www.europaquotidiano.it/author/massimo-faggioli/
 http://www.huffingtonpost.it/massimo-faggioli/

1970 births
University of Bologna alumni
Second Vatican Council
Living people
Italian Roman Catholics